There are at least 110 named lakes and reservoirs in Pulaski County, Arkansas.

Lakes
Big Lake, el.  
Devoe Lake, el.  
Ferguson Lake, el.  
Georgetown Lake, el.  
Ginhouse Lake, el.  
Hills Lake, el.  
Horseshoe Lake, el.  
Lake Kuykendall, el.  
McQuire Lake, el.  
 Old River Lake, el.  
 Peeler Lake, el.  
 Rosenbaum Lake, el.  
 Round Hole, el.  
 Sadler Pond, el.  
 Trammel Lake, el.  
 Willow Beach Lake, el.

Reservoirs
Aldersgate Lake, el.  
Alneta Lake, el.  
Baldwin Lake, el.  
Beal Lake, el.  
Big Dickinson Lake, el.  
Big Rock Settling Pond, el.  
Bredlow Reservoir, el.  
Broadmoor Lake, el.  
Brown Lake, el.  
Camp Grundy Lake, el.  
Camp Robinson Lake Number One, el.  
Camp Robinson Lake Number Two, el.  
Cecil White Reservoir, el.  
Cook Lake, el.  
Coulter Lake, el.  
Dailey Lake, el.  
David D Terry Lake, el.  
Davis Lake, el.  
Dougan Lake, el.  
Dupree Lake, el.  
Eanes Minnow Farm Lake Number One, el.  
Eanes Minnow Farm Lake Number Two, el.  
Faulkner Lake, el.  
Fletcher Lake, el.  
Foreman Lake, el.  
Fountain Head Lake, el.  
Gardner Company Lake, el.  
Ginger Hill Lake, el.  
Glover Lake, el.  
Gray's Lake, el.  
Green Bear Lake, el.  
Green Lake, el.  
Gribble Lake, el.  
Gropper Lake, el.  
Harris Lake, el.  
Hatcher Lake Number One, el.  
Hatcher Lake Number Two, el.  
Hudmans Lake Number One, el.  
Hudmans Lake Number Two, el.  
Indianhead Lake, el.  
Jackson Lake, el.  
Jackson Reservoir, el.  
Keener Lake, el.  
Kirk Lake, el.  
Koban Lake, el.  
L D Rogers Lake, el.  
Lake Alpine, el.  
Lake Bendine, el.  
Lake Cherrywood, el.  
Lake Florence, el.  
Lake Maumelle, el.  
Lake Nixon, el.  
Lake Number One, el.  
Lake Number Six, el.  
Lake Number Three, el.  
Lake Number Two, el.  
Lake Patricia, el.  
Lake Valencia, el.  
Lakewood Lake Number One, el.  
Laman Lake, el.  
Landmark Lake, el.  
Little Indian Lake Number One, el.  
Little Indian Lake Number Two, el.  
Lower Spring Lake, el.  
Matthews Lake, el.  
Mills Valley Lake, el.  
Montgomery Lake, el.  
Nixon Lake, el.  
Paradise Lake, el.  
Pine Crest Lake, el.  
Pleasant Valley Country Club Lake, el.  
Sandpiper Lake, el.  
Second Edition Lake, el.  
Sessions Lake, el.  
Sprick Lake, el.  
Spring Lake, el.  
Spring Valley Lake Number One, el.  
Spring Valley Lake Number Two, el.  
Swan Lake, el.  
Tall Pine Lake, el.  
Tall Timber Lake, el.  
Thomas Lake, el.  
Todd Lake, el.  
Transvaal Lake, el.  
Twin Lakes, el.  
Waldron Lake, el.  
Walton Lake, el.  
Ward Lake, el.  
Western Hills Lake, el.  
Wilkins Lake, el.  
Willastein Lake, el.  
Willow Beach Lake, el.  
Wilson Lake, el.  
Wingate Lake, el.

See also
 List of lakes in Arkansas

Notes

Bodies of water of Pulaski County, Arkansas
Pulaski